Thorium(IV) fluoride (ThF4) is an inorganic chemical compound. It is a white hygroscopic powder which can be produced by reacting thorium with fluorine gas. At temperatures above 500 °C, it reacts with atmospheric moisture to produce ThOF2.

Uses
Despite its (mild) radioactivity, thorium fluoride is used as an antireflection material in multilayered optical coatings. It has excellent optical transparency in the range 0.35–12 µm, and its radiation is primarily due to alpha particles, which can be easily stopped by a thin cover layer of another material. However, like all alpha emitters, thorium is potentially hazardous if incorporated, which means safety should focus on reducing or eliminating this danger. In addition to its radioactivity, thorium is also a chemically toxic heavy metal.

Thorium fluoride was used in making carbon arc lamps, which provided high-intensity illumination for movie projectors and search lights.

See also
 Liquid fluoride thorium reactor

References

Fluorides
Actinide halides
Thorium compounds